Pierre-Georges Arlabosse (8 July 1891 – 8 February 1950) was a French politician who became acting President of Lebanon for 5 days, from 4 to 9  April 1941 for the interim period in transfer of presidency from Émile Eddé, the third president of the Lebanese republic under the French Mandate 1936 to 1941 and president Alfred Naqqache (French transliteration Alfred Georges Naccache), the fourth president for 1941 to 1943.

See also 
List of presidents of Lebanon

References

1891 births
1950 deaths
Arlabosse, Pierre-Georges
Lebanon under French rule
French expatriates in Lebanon